The Association of the British Pharmaceutical Industry (ABPI) is the trade association for over 120 companies in the UK producing prescription medicines for humans, founded in 1891. It is the British equivalent of America's PhRMA; however, the member companies research, develop, manufacture and supply 80% of the medicines prescribed through the National Health Service.

History
The organisation was founded in London in 1891 and originally known as the "Drug Club". It was re-named the Association of the British Pharmaceutical Industry in 1948. A rival institution to represent wholesalers, the "Northern Wholesale Druggists' Association", was formed in 1902 and lasted until 1966.

Management and offices
A board of management of members oversee the ABPI. The Board is made up of individuals who are elected by members to represent the industry and up to five people who are co-opted by the Board. Elections commence every January for elected seats to ensure that the Board is fully representative and has access to the broadest range of skills and expertise possible.

The ABPI's head office is in London with three regional offices in Cardiff, Belfast and Edinburgh.

Membership
Membership of the Association of the British Pharmaceutical Industry is not open to individuals, only companies. Members fall into three categories:

 Full members who hold marketing authorisation for manufacture or supply of a prescription medicine for human use and who undertake business in the UK
 Research affiliate members who carry out business in the UK and are involved in research and/or development of medicines for human use but do not have a UK sales operation, for example contract research organisations  or contract manufacturing organizations
 General affiliate members who operate in the UK, have a business interest in the industry and will typically provide products or services to the industry, although not producing prescription medicines, for example law firms

Functions
The ABPI represents the views of the pharmaceutical industry to government and decision makers in the UK, i.e. is a lobbying organization. The organisation has five departments; Economic, Health and Commercial Policy; Research, Medical and Innovation; Corporate Affairs and Devolved Nations; Legal and Membership Services.

The Research, Medical and Innovation department oversees complimentary resources for schools in UK to promote links between school science subjects and their applications in industrial research. The department also runs a careers website. The association sponsors booklets on a range of conditions, aimed at patients, carers and healthcare professionals.

The ABPI Code of Practice
The ABPI Code of Practice covers the promotion of medicines for prescribing to health professionals and administrative staff as well as the provision of information to the public about prescription only medicines in the UK. The Code sets standards for the promotion of medicines to health professionals and other relevant decision makers in the UK. It also covers interactions between the industry and health professionals.

The ABPI Code sets standards relating to the provision of information about prescription-only medicines to the public and patients, and pharmaceutical companies’ relationships with patient organisations. The ABPI Code does not cover the promotion of over-the-counter medicines to the public. All ABPI member companies are obliged to comply with both the spirit and letter of the Code.

The ABPI Code is a self-regulatory code, first established by the ABPI in 1958 and undergoes revisions at least every two years.

It is regularly updated and reviewed in consultation with the Medicines and Healthcare products Regulatory Agency (MHRA), the British Medical Association (BMA), the Royal Pharmaceutical Society (RPS), the Royal College of Nursing (RCN), the Competition and Markets Authority (CMA) and the Serious Fraud Office (SFO). It is administered by the Prescription Medicines Code of Practice Authority (PMCPA).

Criticism
Ben Goldacre criticised the pharmaceutical industry in his 2012 book Bad Pharma as testing itself what it manufactures in "poorly designed trials, on hopelessly small numbers of weird, unrepresentative patients, and analysed using techniques that are flawed by design, in such a way that they exaggerate the benefits of treatments".  
The ABPI responded that medicines were "tested against the most effective comparator where possible unless there is no current standard of care." 
Regarding "results that companies don't like, [which] they are perfectly entitled to hide [..] from doctors and patients ... academic papers, which everyone thinks of as objective, are often covertly planned and written by people who work directly for the companies, without disclosure." the ABPI responded that it  did "... not seek to "hide" trial data" and was recognising there was "still work to be done in ensuring the publication of negative trial data within journals, and in ensuring greater transparency all round within the industry".

See also

 Faculty of Pharmaceutical Medicine
 List of pharmaceutical companies
 List of pharmaceutical manufacturers in the United Kingdom
 List of pharmacy organisations in the United Kingdom
 Lobbying in the United Kingdom
 Medicines and Healthcare products Regulatory Agency
 Pharmaceutical industry in the United Kingdom
 Royal Pharmaceutical Society of Great Britain

References

External links
 Association for the British Pharmaceutical Industry (ABPI) Website
 Profile of ABPI on Corporate Watch Website

Video clips
 ABPI YouTube channel

Pharmacy organisations in the United Kingdom
Organizations established in 1891
Pharmaceutical industry trade groups
1891 establishments in the United Kingdom
Life sciences industry